US Triestina Hockey was a Roller Hockey team from Trieste, Italy. It was founded in 1925 and disappeared in the early 1990s. I was once one of the greatest roller hockey clubs in Italy.

Honours
Serie A1 italian championship: 19
 1925°, 1926°, 1927°, 1928°, 1929°, 1937*, 1938*, 1939*, 1940*, 1941*, 1942*, 1945°, 1952°, 1954°, 1955°, 1962°, 1963°, 1964°, 1967°

° as US Triestina (as one of the many sports sections composing the "Unione Sportiva").* as Pubblico Impiego Trieste''.

External links

Roller hockey clubs in Italy
Sports clubs established in 1922